Emamzadeh Abdol Aziz Rural District is a rural district (dehestan) in Jolgeh District, Isfahan County, Isfahan Province, Iran. At the 2006 census, its population was 9,019, in 2,356 families.  The rural district has 25 villages.

References 

Rural Districts of Isfahan Province
Isfahan County